Asarta fuliginosa is a species of snout moth in the genus Asarta. It was described by Alfred Jefferis Turner in 1941, and is known from Australia.

References

Moths described in 1941
Phycitini
Moths of Australia